Jackie Chan DC Racing, formerly known as DC Racing, is a racing team that currently competes in the FIA World Endurance Championship and Asian Le Mans Series. The team is co-owned by Asian Le Mans champion David Cheng and actor Jackie Chan. Partnering with Jota Sport in WEC, the team fields Oreca 07: the No. 37 for Ho-Pin Tung, Gabriel Aubry and Will Stevens.

History
In 2015, two-time Asian Le Mans Series champion David Cheng formed DC Racing. Based in Wuhan, the team hired OAK Racing personnel Remy Brouard, for whom Cheng raced, as team principal. DC Racing also established a partnership with Eurasia Motorsport, fielding a Ligier JS P3 in the LMP3 class for Cheng, former OAK Racing teammate and fellow Chinese driver Ho-Pin Tung and Frenchman Thomas Laurent. The team ended the season with the Team Championship and a spot in the 2016 24 Hours of Le Mans.

In March 2015, Cheng met actor and martial artist Jackie Chan, who discussed his enjoyment of Steve McQueen's movie Le Mans as well as his interest in racing. After Cheng finished ninth in the LMP2 class at Le Mans that year, Chan raised the possibility of owning a team together for 2016, to which Cheng agreed. Together, the two entered DC Racing into the FIA World Endurance Championship under the Baxi DC Racing Alpine banner, partnering with Signatech Alpine and fielding rebadged Oreca 05 cars as Alpine A460s in the LMP2 class. The team is the first mainland China-based operation in WEC; Cheng and Tung joined the new program, along with French drivers Nelson Panciatici and Paul-Loup Chatin.

In October, leading into the 2016–17 Asian Le Mans Series season, the team was rebranded to Jackie Chan DC Racing and raced with liveries promoting Chan's movie Kung Fu Yoga. DC Racing fielded cars in both the LMP2 and LMP3 classes; Tung, Laurent and Gustavo Menezes raced in the former, while Cheng, James Winslow and Pu Jun Jin drove in the latter.

For the 2017 WEC season, the team partnered with Jota Sport to run the No. 37 for Cheng, Alex Brundle and Tristan Gommendy, along with the No. 38 for Tung, Laurent and Oliver Jarvis. At Le Mans, the No. 38 took advantage of a small LMP1 grid and problems striking the LMP1s to lead overall laps, becoming the first LMP2 team to do so at Le Mans. With one hour remaining, the No. 2 Porsche of Timo Bernhard passed Tung and went on to win the overall, although the No. 38's second-place overall finish was still impressive nonetheless and won DC Racing the LMP2 class. DC's No. 37 car finished fourth overall, but Rebellion Racing's No. 13 was disqualified after failing post-race inspection and the No. 37 was promoted onto the podium. The No. 38's effort marked the first time a Chinese team won its class at Le Mans. Chan, who was not present at the race, congratulated the team on its performance.

Race record

24 Hours of Le Mans results

Complete FIA World Endurance Championship results

Asian Le Mans Series results

References

External links
 
 

Chinese auto racing teams
Auto racing teams established in 2015
2015 establishments in China
24 Hours of Le Mans teams
WeatherTech SportsCar Championship teams
FIA World Endurance Championship teams